Love Agenda is the second album by Band of Susans, released on April 17, 1989 by Blast First and Restless Records. Page Hamilton, later frontman for Helmet, played guitar on the album and sang the lead vocals on the track "It's Locked Away". Also notable was bassist Susan Stenger singing her first lead vocals on the songs "The Pursuit of Happiness", "Birthmark" and "Hard Light". Robert Poss was an admirer of the Rolling Stones and CD versions of Love Agenda features a cover of "Child of the Moon".

Track listing

Personnel 
Adapted from Love Agenda liner notes.

Band of Susans
 Karen Haglof – electric guitar, backing vocals
 Page Hamilton – electric guitar, lead vocals (A2)
 Robert Poss – electric guitar, lead vocals (A4, B2, B4), production
 Ron Spitzer – drums
 Susan Stenger – bass guitar, lead vocals (A1, A3, B3)

Production and additional personnel
 Chris Gehringer – mastering
 Jim Klein – engineering
 Russ Landis – engineering

Charts

Release history

References

External links 
 

1989 albums
Band of Susans albums
Restless Records albums
Blast First albums
Albums produced by Robert Poss